Death of a Whaler is a novel written by Australian author Nerida Newton and was first published in 2006. It is Newton's second novel.

Plot summary

Byron Bay, 1962. On the second last day before the whaling station is closed down for good, Flinch, the young spotter, is involved in a terrible accident.

Over a decade later, Flinch has become a recluse, unable to move on from that fatal moment. The Bay, too, seems stalled in its bloody past, the land and the ocean on which it was founded now barren and unyielding.

It is only after crossing paths with Karma, a girl living in one of the hinterland's first hippie communes, that Flinch gradually and reluctantly embarks upon a path towards healing, coming to terms with his past, present and future.

External links 
Nerida Newton's Home Page

2006 Australian novels
Novels set in the 1960s
Fiction set in 1962
Novels set in New South Wales
Allen & Unwin books